FC Volga Ulyanovsk is a professional association football club based in Ulyanovsk, Russia. In the 2022–23 season, it will play in the second-tier Russian First League.

Their reserve team FC Volga-d Ulyanovsk used to play professionally as FC Energiya Ulyanovsk.

History
In 2008, they were relegated to the Russian Second Division 2009 after they finished 17th in Russian First Division. In December 2008, Volga signed a partnership agreement with Floriana FC of Malta, the most successful club in Maltese football.

On 4 June 2022, the last day of the 2021–22 season, Volga secured the first place in their FNL2 group and promotion for the 2022–23 season to the second-tier FNL.

Club name and location history
1947–1957: FC Torpedo Ulyanovsk
1958: FC Dynamo Ulyanovsk
1959–1961: FC Spartak Ulyanovsk
1961–1985: FC Volga Ulyanovsk
1986–1991: FC Start Ulyanovsk
1992–1995: FC Tekstilshchik Isheyevka
1996–2005: FC Volga Ulyanovsk
2006: FC Volga-Energiya Ulyanovsk (the reserves team currently known as FC Volga-d Ulyanovsk played as FC Volga-Energiya Ulyanovsk in the Amateur Football League in 2007)
2007–present: FC Volga Ulyanovsk

Current squad
As of 22 February 2023, according to the official First League website.

Out on loan

References

External links
Official website 

Association football clubs established in 1947
Football clubs in Russia
Sport in Ulyanovsk
1947 establishments in Russia